William Whitfield Crane IV (born January 19, 1968) is an American singer and founding member and lead vocalist of the rock band Ugly Kid Joe, which was formed in 1989. He has also worked in music outside his band, from performing guest vocals on numerous songs to contributing to musical efforts with other rock bands such as Life of Agony, Another Animal, and Richards/Crane.

Early life 
Crane was born on January 19, 1968, in Palo Alto, California. His father left the family when Crane was little. After his father's departure, Crane started to be interested in rock music.

Work outside Ugly Kid Joe 
During Ugly Kid Joe's inactivity, Crane went on a year-long tour with New York hard rock band Life of Agony before forming Medication with ex-Machine Head guitarist Logan Mader. Due to a series of internal issues, Medication disbanded in February 2003.

Over the years, Crane has performed guest vocals on several songs, including "Reaching Out" with Mark McGrath of Sugar Ray (from the Lynn Strait tribute album Strait Up), "Born to Raise Hell" by Motörhead (also featuring rapper Ice-T) and "Voodoo Brother" by Glenn Tipton of Judas Priest.

Crane's filmography includes Ellie Parker, in which he has a cameo appearance as an acting student, and Motörhead's 25 & Alive Boneshaker, where he appears as himself.

In 2006, former Ugly Kid Joe bandmate Shannon Larkin asked Crane to join a side project he formed with members of Godsmack (minus Sully Erna) called Another Animal, as primary vocalist.  Crane accepted, and the band released its self-titled debut album in 2007. In support of their debut, the band went out on tour, opening for labelmates Alter Bridge. However, they have suffered poor record sales, and the future of the band is currently unknown.

In 2011, he performed with metal tribute band Hail! in Istanbul, Turkey. He made regular appearances with Motörhead – the last being at the O2 Academy Glasgow on November 9, 2012, singing "Killed by Death".

In 2016, Crane collaborated with Lee Richards, formerly of Godsmack, to form a band called Richards/Crane. The band released an album titled World Stands Still.

Orchestra of Doom 
On July 29, 2016, at the Teatro Ristori Theatre in Verona, Crane unveiled his new classical music project Orchestra of Doom. Fronting the Machivelli 32-piece Orchestra, Crane sang classics by Black Sabbath, Ozzy Osbourne, as well as tracks from Ugly Kid Joe and his acoustic based project Richards/Crane. The Orchestra was conducted by Andrea Battistoni and featured only acoustic instruments.

In June 2019, it was announced that Crane along with executive producer Pat Cash would be bringing Orchestra of Doom to Australia in December for two shows in Melbourne and Sydney. Following the same format, Whitfield will be fronting the 35-piece Philharmonia Orchestra.

Possible replacement for Rob Halford in Judas Priest 
In an August 2019 interview with Metal Rules, Crane said that he was once offered to be the vocalist for Judas Priest while the band was in search for a new vocalist after Rob Halford's departure in 1992. He said that guitarist Glenn Tipton offered him and drummer Shannon Larkin the gig if they wanted it during the recording sessions of Tipton's solo album Baptizm of Fire. Crane explained that he couldn't accept the offer, "because you can't be Rob Halford. You can't be David Lee Roth. It'd be cool, and considering my love for Priest, which is immense, that would have been cool to do it, but not really. It's not a good move. But to jam with Tipton and to know those guys — I mean, those are my fucking heroes. Judas Priest, I mean, fuck. But man, old-school Priest, Jesus, God. So, yeah, I got offered Priest, back in the day. I never said that to anyone."

Compilation credits 
 1994 Born to Raise Hell / Motörhead with Ice-T and Whitfield Crane – Single, Airheads Original Soundtrack
 1994 N.I.B. / Ugly Kid Joe – Nativity in Black
 1996 Burnin' Up / Doom Squad – A Tribute to Judas Priest: Legends of Metal
 1997 Voodoo Brother / Glenn Tipton – Baptizm of Fire
 1998 Live Wire, Ride On / The Sensational Whitskiteer Band – Thunderbolt: A Tribute to AC/DC
 2000 Live Wire (Wired Remix) / Remixed to Hell: AC/DC Tribute
 2000 Reaching Out / Strait Up: A Tribute to Lynn Strait
 2001 Welcome Home (Sanitarium) / Metallic Assault: A Tribute to Metallica
 2002 Lord of Thighs / One Way Street: A Tribute to Aerosmith
 2004 Master of Puppets / Metallic Attack: The Ultimate Tribute
 2013 Rock 'n' Roll Damnation / Dead City Ruins – Dead City Ruins
 2013 Killed By Death / Critical Solution – Evil Never Dies
 2013 Essence / Sight of Emptiness – Instincts
 2015 Richards/Crane – World Stands Still
 2015 Steal Away The Night – Randy Rhoads Remembered Volume 1
 2015 Come On, Come Over / Mass Mental – Jaco (original soundtrack)
 2017 Cloudy Skies (Ugly Kid Joe – acoustic cover) – Tim McMillan – Hiraeth
 2018 Yellowcake – Yellowcake (EP)
 2018 Children of Disease / Leader of Down – Cascade into Chaos
 2019 Dancing Dogs (Love Survives) / Phil Campbell – Old Lions Still Roar
 2020 Twenty Four Hours / Molybaron

References

External links 

Whitfield Crane Information, Lyrics and Pictures

1968 births
Living people
American rock singers
American heavy metal singers
American male singers
Ugly Kid Joe members
Palo Alto High School alumni
Musicians from Palo Alto, California
Mass Mental members
Another Animal members